Konstantinos Paleokapas (1600 – after 1640) was a Greek painter active during the 17th century. He was active in Crete. His contemporaries were: Elias Moskos, Leos Moskos, Victor (iconographer), Franghias Kavertzas and Ieremias Palladas.  His style was similar to his contemporaries, the artists were part of the Cretan School.  The art was heavily influenced by Venetian art.  His remaining work testifies to the style of the region.  Six of his works have survived.  His most notable work is the Crucifixion of Christ.  His Crucifixion is comparable to the Ioannis Moskos Crucifixion and The Crucifixion (Pavias) by Andreas Pavias.  His Crucifixion lacks the unique Impenitent thief found in many followers of Pavias's style.  His Crucifixion mostly resembles Ioannis Moskos.  Paleokapas had a unique style.  Most of his work is at the Gonia Monastery in Crete.

History
He was born in Chania Crete. Not much is known about his life.  Historians have dated his activity between 1620-1645.  The island was an epicenter for painters during this period. His work resembles local masters. His works include paintings of Deesis created in 1635.  This piece is in Agios Georgios Afentis in Vroulidia Sifnos.  His paintings of Nicolaos Enthroned 1637, The Crucifixion, and Neilos are at the Gonia Monastery in Chania Crete.  His signature is on four of his works.  His most prevalent signature is χείρ Κωνσταντίνου Παλεοκάπα.  His style influenced countless painters both Greek and Italian.  Other artists who are also known to have painted the Crucifixion in a similar style are: Theophanes the Cretan, Frangos Kontaris, Emmanuel Lambardos, and Georgios Margkazinis.

Gallery

References

Bibliography

Cretan Renaissance painters
17th-century Greek people
17th-century Greek painters
People from Chania
1600 births